Gymnastics is a sport at the Universiade that was first contested in 1961. The first time artistic gymnastics was played was in that year, turning in a compulsory event in 1963 and since then it has been out of the program twice in 1975 and 1989. In 1973, for the first time a competition in apparatus was added to the program and would become mandatory in 1979. In 1991, Rhythmic Gymnastics was one of the two optional sports chosen by the organizers and was present with the same status in 1995 in 1997, becoming a compulsory sport in 2001. At the 2011 edition, aerobic gymnastics was also part of the program.

All Editions

All Time Medal table 
Note  Last updated after the 2019 Summer Universiade

Artistic gymnastics

All Editions

Rytimic gymnastics

All Editions

Rhythmic gymnastics All Time medal table

Aerobic gymnastics medal table

References 

Sports123 (1961-2009)
2011 Summer Universiade – Artistic gymnastics
2011 Summer Universiade – Rhythmic gymnastics
2011 Summer Universiade – Aerobic gymnastics
2013 Summer Universiade – Artistic gymnastics
2013 Summer Universiade – Rhythmic gymnastics
2015 Summer Universiade – Artistic gymnastics
2015 Summer Universiade – Rhythmic gymnastics

 
Sports at the Summer Universiade
Summer Universiade